The Men's 2008 European Amateur Boxing Championships were held in Liverpool, England in November 2008. They were the 37th edition of this biennial competition organised by the European governing body for amateur boxing, EABA.

Medal winners

Medal table

External links
Official 2008 European Amateur Boxing Championship website

European Amateur Boxing Championships
European Amateur Boxing Championships
European Amateur Boxing Championships
International sports competitions in Liverpool
Boxing in England
International boxing competitions hosted by the United Kingdom
2000s in Liverpool
European Amateur Boxing Championships